Rudy Johan "Ruud" Berger (born February 18, 1980, in Utrecht) is a retired football midfielder from the Netherlands.

Club career
Berger came through the FC Utrecht youth system before making his senior debut in the 1998–99 season. He was loaned to Cambuur in 2001. After two seasons at Emmen he moved to FC Zwolle in 2004.

In August 2005 he joined Eredivisie club RKC Waalwijk, but a knee injury sustained in pre-season forced him to make his debut a few months later. In summer 2010, Berger decided to quit football, citing a loss of motivation and pleasure.

Personal life
His father Han Berger has coached various clubs in the Netherlands.

References

External links
 Profile

1980 births
Living people
Footballers from Utrecht (city)
Association football midfielders
Dutch footballers
FC Utrecht players
SC Cambuur players
FC Emmen players
PEC Zwolle players
RKC Waalwijk players
Eredivisie players
Eerste Divisie players